Thomisus callidus, the yellow crab spider, is a species of spider of the genus Thomisus. It is found in Sri Lanka, Singapore, Sumatra, Nias Island, and Java. They often hide in flowers and are able to change colors just to blend in to capture preys.

References

Thomisidae
Fauna of Singapore
Spiders of Asia
Spiders described in 1890